Orlando paladino (English: The Paladin Orlando), Hob. 28/11, is an opera in three acts by Joseph Haydn which was first performed at Eszterháza on 6 December 1782. The opera was described as a dramma eroicomico and the plot mixes heroic and comic elements. It was Haydn's most popular opera during his lifetime. While in Prague, Mozart conducted a few performances of the opera. The Pennsylvania Opera Theater presented the United States premiere of the work at the Trocadero Theatre, Philadelphia, in March 1982 with John Gilmore in the title role.

Roles

The opera makes a reference to castrati during Pasquale's act 2 aria "Ecco spiano", during which he sings Ah, che un musico castrato come me non canta affé (Even a castrato cannot sing as well as me). The same aria is also notable for requiring the tenor to go into falsetto to hit some of the high notes.

Synopsis

Act 1
Scene 1 – A mountainous landscape.
The shepherdess Eurilla and her father Licone are alarmed by the appearance of a threatening knight, searching for Angelica and Medoro. Eurilla tells him of their love and that they have taken refuge in the nearby castle. The knight reveals himself as Rodomonte, King of Barbary, infatuated with Angelica and intent on protecting her from Orlando’s jealousy.
Scene 2 – Angelica’s tower.
Angelica laments that she has to live in hiding to avoid Orlando’s mad frenzy. She summons the sorceress Alcina, who offers her protection. Medoro now enters with the unwelcome news that Orlando and his squire Pasquale have been sighted nearby but is unsure whether to stay or escape.
Scene 3 – A wood.
Pasquale is discovered by Rodomonte, who proceeds to challenge him, but is distracted by Eurilla, who says that Orlando is nearby looking for him. Alone with Eurilla, Pasquale explains that his life of adventure is blighted by a constant lack of food (and love).
Scene 4 – A garden with a fountain.
Medoro swears his fidelity to Angelica but despite her protests suggests that for her own safety he should leave her for a time. When they have gone, Orlando appears, cursing the obsession that drives him on, convinced that Medoro is the only obstacle to the fulfilment of his love. He sees that Medoro has carved Angelica’s name on every tree in the garden and smashes down the trees and fountain. 
Scene 5 – A grove.
The braggart Rodomonte is still in pursuit of Orlando and narrowly misses him when he arrives to interrogate Eurilla, on the whereabouts of Medoro.
Scene 6 – A delightful garden.
Angelica’s fearful premonitions are interrupted by Pasquale and Eurilla, who warn her of Orlando’s approach. Rodomonte joins them, still eager to fight Orlando, and then the peace-loving Medoro, in fear of Orlando’s prowess enters. Alcina appears and reassures the lovers, while warning Rodomonte that he cannot defeat Orlando. Orlando bursts in raving, but Alcina magically immobilises him and imprisons him in an iron cage.

Act 2
Scene 1 – A grove.
Orlando has been freed from the cage, but not from his madness. Rodomonte is once more about to attack him, but when Eurilla brings news that Medoro and Angelica have fled, Orlando dashes off in pursuit. Scene 2 – A wide plain by the sea
Medoro seeks refuge by the sea, and at Eurilla’s suggestion, conceals himself in a grotto, asking her to tell Angelica of his unhappy fate. Eurilla and Pasquale discover their love for one another as she invites him to follow her to a castle. Angelica laments her suffering. Alcina plans to resolve the lovers’ difficulties. As Angelica is about the throw herself into the sea in despair, Alcina’s magic transports her to Medoro’s presence and they re-affirm their love. They are on the point of seeking a new refuge when Orlando appears, but Alcina intervenes again to allow the lovers to escape. Orlando is distracted by the sudden appearance of two sea-monsters.
Scene 3 – A room in the castle
Pasquale and Eurilla exchange more endearments. Rodomonte enters with Alcina, who invites all to her magic grotto.
Scene 4 – Alcina’s enchanted cave.
Orlando and Pasquale arrive in search of Alcina, and the paladin furiously insults the sorceress for protecting Medoro. She responds by turning him to stone. Angelica, Medoro, Eurilla and Rodomonte enter, marvelling at this sight. Alcina restores Orlando to his human state, but his frenzy is unabated. As Alcina retires to the back of the cave Orlando pursues her and the rock closes in behind him.

Act 3
Scene 1 – The Underworld, by the river Lethe, the Elysian Fields beyond Charon, the infernal ferryman, watches over the sleeping Orlando. Alcina commands him to wash away Orlando’s madness with water from the river of forgetfulness, and Orlando wakens confused.
Scene 2 – A room in the castle
While discussing their marriage, Eurilla and Pasquale are interrupted by Orlando, seeking his squire’s aid.
Scene 3 – A forest
Angelica is pursued by wild savages. Medoro rushes to her assistance but is wounded. Rodomonte and Orlando engage in a duel.
Scene 4 – A courtyard
Angelica is delirious, believing that Medoro is dead. Alcina assures her that this is not so, but that he is healed of his wounds. Rodomonte and Orlando enter together, now comrades. The waters of Lethe have blanked from Orlando’s mind both his love for Angelica and his hatred of Medoro. Angelica and Medoro can now love one another without fear, Pasquale and Eurilla are united, and Orlando may go in search of fresh deeds of valour.

The opera is scored for flute, two oboes, two bassoons, two horns/trumpets, timpani, strings, continuo.

Selected recordings
Orlando paladino, Arleen Auger, Elly Ameling, George Shirley, Lausanne CO, conducted by Antal Doráti (Philips, 1977)
Orlando paladino, Patricia Petibon, Christian Gerhaher, Michael Schade, Elisabeth von Magnus, Concentus Musicus Wien, conducted by Nikolaus Harnoncourt (Deutsche Harmonia Mundi, 2006)
Thomas Quasthoff recorded Rodomonte's aria, "Mille lampi d'accese faville", and Caronte's aria, "Ombre insepolte" on his album, Haydn Italian Arias (2009) and Anne Sofie von Otter recorded "Ad un sguardo, a un cenno solo" on her Mozart-Haydn-Gluck album with Trevor Pinnock.
"Orlando Paladino", Marlis Petersen, Alexandrina Pendatchanska, Sunhae Im, Tom Randle, Pietro Spagnoli, Magnus Staveland, Victor Torres, Arttu Kataj. René Jacobs.(Staatsoper unter den Linden, 2009) Naxos 2057788. DVD and Blu-ray.

References

Further reading
The Viking Opera Guide, ed. Amanda Holden (1993)

External links

Italian-language operas
Operas by Joseph Haydn
1782 operas
Operas
Operas based on works by Ludovico Ariosto